Hallianthus is a monotypic genus of flowering plants belonging to the family Aizoaceae. It only contains one species, Hallianthus planus

It is native to the Cape Provinces of the South African Republic.

The genus name of Hallianthus is in honour of Harry Hall (1906–1986), a British-born horticulturist, botanist and succulent plant authority. The Latin specific epithet of planus refers to flat.
Hallianthus planus was first described and published in Bot. Jahrb. Syst. Vol.104 on page 167 in 1983.

References

Aizoaceae
Aizoaceae genera
Plants described in 1983
Flora of the Cape Provinces
Taxa named by Heidrun Hartmann
Monotypic Caryophyllales genera